In convex analysis, Danskin's theorem is a theorem which provides information about the derivatives of a function of the form

The theorem has applications in optimization, where it sometimes is used to solve minimax problems. The original theorem given by J. M. Danskin in his 1967 monograph  provides a formula for the directional derivative of the maximum of a (not necessarily convex) directionally differentiable function. 

An extension to more general conditions was proven 1971 by Dimitri Bertsekas.

Statement
The following version is proven in "Nonlinear programming" (1991). Suppose  is a continuous function of two arguments,

where  is a compact set.

Under these conditions, Danskin's theorem provides conclusions regarding the convexity and differentiability of the function

To state these results, we define the set of maximizing points  as

Danskin's theorem then provides the following results.

Convexity
  is convex.

Directional semi-differential

Derivative
  is differentiable at  if  consists of a single element .

Example of no directional derivative 

Subdifferential 

Extension

The 1971 Ph.D. Thesis by Bertsekas (Proposition A.22)  proves a more general result, which does not require that  is differentiable.

See also

 Maximum theorem
 Envelope theorem
 Hotelling's lemma

References

Convex optimization
Theorems in analysis